Corymbia ptychocarpa, commonly known as the swamp bloodwood or spring bloodwood, is a species of tree that is endemic to northwestern Australia. It has rough bark on the trunk and branches, broadly lance-shaped adult leaves, flower buds in groups of seven, creamy yellow, pink or red flowers, and barrel-shaped, ribbed fruit.

Description
It has the form of a crooked tree that tends to flop when young and often has drooping branches. The midrib is pale yellow in contrast to the green lamina and the lateral veins are parallel to each other. Flowering occurs from February to May and the flowers are creamy yellow, pink or red.

Taxonomy and naming
Swamp bloodwood was first formally described in 1859 by Ferdinand von Mueller who gave it the name Eucalyptus ptychocarpa and published the description in the Journal of the Proceedings of the Linnean Society, Botany. In 1995 Ken Hill and Lawrence Alexander Sidney Johnson changed the name to Corymbia ptychocarpa.

In the same paper, Hill and Johnson described two subspecies and the names are accepted by the Australian Plant Census:
 Corymbia ptychocarpa subsp. aptycha K.D.Hill & L.A.S.Johnson that differs from the autonym in having the flower buds and fruit not, or only indistinctly ribbed.
 Corymbia ptychocarpa (F.Muell.) K.D.Hill & L.A.S.Johnson subsp. ptychocarpa.

Distribution and habitat
Corymbia ptychocarpa is found from the Kimberley region of Western Australia and through the Top End of the Northern Territory to near Doomadgee in far north-western Queensland. It grows in sandy soils and alluvium along watercourses and near springs. In the Northern Territory it occurs on the Arnhem Plateau, Daly Basin, Ord Victoria Plain, Pine Creek and the Victoria Bonaparte biogeographic regions.

Subspecies aptycha is restricted to the Top End between the Cobourg Peninsula, Yirrkala and El Sharana in Arnhem Land.

It is also grown as a street tree in parts of Queensland such as Cairns and Townsville.

See also
 List of Corymbia species

References

ptychocarpa
Flora of the Northern Territory
Flora of Western Australia
Flora of Queensland
Drought-tolerant trees
Myrtales of Australia
Plants described in 1859
Taxa named by Ferdinand von Mueller